Bo Diddley in the Spotlight is the fourth album by musician Bo Diddley, recorded in 1959-60 and released on the Checker label. The album contains the hit single "Road Runner".

Reception

AllMusic's Bruce Eder wrote that "there are surprises from these 1960-vintage recordings ... that make this record more than worthwhile."

Track listing 
All tracks by Ellas McDaniel 
 "Road Runner" – 2:45
 "Story of Bo Diddley" – 2:42
 "Scuttle Bug" – 2:20
 "Signifying Blues" – 2:31
 "Let Me In" – 1:52
 "Limber" – 2:26
 "Love Me" – 2:20
 "Craw-Dad" – 2:25
 "Walkin' and Talkin'" – 2:38
 "Travellin' West" – 1:44
 "Deed and Deed I Do" – 2:15
 "Live My Life" – 2:35

Personnel 
Bo Diddley – vocals, guitar
Peggy Jones – guitar, background vocals
Jody Williams – guitar
Lafayette Leake, Otis Spann – piano
Willie Dixon – bass
Clifton James, Frank Kirkland – drums
Jerome Green – maracas, backing vocals
Gene Barge – tenor saxophone 
Billy Boy Arnold – harmonica

References 

1960 albums
Bo Diddley albums
Checker Records albums
Albums produced by Phil Chess
Albums produced by Leonard Chess